On the morning of 6 December 1868, marshal of the Imperial Brazilian Army, Luís Alves de Lima e Silva, Marquis (later Duke) of Caxias, moved with 16,999 infantrymen, 926 cavalrymen and 742 artillerymen, to take Villeta, a Paraguayan city, as a plan to make further attacks on the Paraguayan Army rear. Nevertheless, Paraguayan president and commander-in-chief of the army Francisco Solano López was aware of the landing the Allies had made in the rear of his army.

Taking advantage of the Allies' slow march, he sent colonel Bernardino Caballero with 5,000 men and 12 guns, to stop the enemy at a narrow passage over a stream called Ytororó. Caballero deployed his troops so that Caxias would have to cross the only passage at disposal (a bridge) under heavy fire.

The battle started by late morning and was characterized by attacks and counterattacks for control of the bridge. By nightfall, after a fierce fight, the bridge was taken by Brazilian volunteer battalions led personally by marshal Caxias shouting "Follow me, those of you who are Brazilians", and the Allies could advance towards Villeta.

The battle
The Imperial Brazilian Army received a new order: the 48th Fatherland Volunteers Corps, under the command of major Secundino Filafiano de Melo Tamborim, passed from the 9th to the 5th Infantry Brigade of colonel Fernando Machado de Sousa. From then on, this detachment had the 1st and 13th Infantry Battalions and the 34th and 48th Volunteer Corps.

The brigade of colonel Fernando Machado, who was reunited with the 2nd Infantry Brigade colonel Domingos Rodrigues Seixas, formed the 2nd Infantry Division of colonel Salustiano Jerônimo dos Reis, from the 2nd Army Corps of marshal Alexandre Gomes de Argolo Ferrão Filho, who would be responsible for ensuring security when the army disembarked at Guarda de Santo Antonio, more precisely in the rut of the left margin.

On 4 December 1868, the Infantry and Artillery that was camped in the Chaco region embarked. The cavalry, under the command of brigadier José Luís Mena Barreto, followed by land to the border town of Santa Helena, located in the province of Paraná, chosen point for landing on the left bank of the river.

The Paraguayan army was commanded by general Bernardino Caballero, with a force of five to six thousand men, divided into sixteen infantry battalions, six cavalry regiments, and twelve guns. In command of the infantry was lieutenant colonel Germano Serrano, the cavalry was divided into two wings under the command of colonel Valois Rivarola and major Juan Lanson respectively. At the top of the hill, just beyond the bridge over the creek was the artillery, commanded by major Moreno.

According to José Bernardino Bormann, on the 5th of December Caxias arrived to inspect the camp, the troops and their willingness to venture. Asked by Caxias concerning the occupation of the bridge over the Ytororó stream and its surroundings, general Argolo Ferrão answered that it was not possible to attack due to the lack of sufficient cavalry and even mules to help pull the artillery.

Although with unpleasant news about the occupation of the stream, Caxias decided to move forward and occupy the desired position by sending the squadrons of João Niederauer Sobrinho and two infantry battalions, promising to increase the strength and firepower with more infantry and artillery when they got enough animals to carry greater load. The path leading to the edge of the stream was tortuous, with a dense vegetation that hindered the movement of the units, however, when Niederauer arrived, the Paraguayans were already entrenched on the other side of the river.

By nightfall, Niederauer warned general Argolo about the enemy positioning and awaited further orders from Caxias. It was already dark and with the rugged and little known terrain, Caxias ordered Niederauer to retreat, but also to tell the general about strategic positions in which the advanced forces should remain until dawn. During the wait, it is reported that the troops had a festive air, the soldiers were at ease, dancing and singing around campfires.

After a night of joy and festivities to overcome nervousness, Dec. 6 arrives with silence and apprehension. With the touch of dawn, the soldiers begin their chores and ready for the inevitable conflict.

To get to the bridge Itororó through the city of San Antonio, Brazilian troops would travel more than two miles, through a difficult road for the cavalry and artillery. For the safety of the group, the Brigade of Colonel Fernando Machado composed of four battalions followed in the rear, making the security of the 2nd Army Corps. The latter ensured the protection of the first group, the Squadron Cavalry Brigade Colonel Niederauer Nephew.

When the task force came together to bridge Itororó the army commanded by Colonel Serrano was already in place, waiting for the clash with the Brazilians. By order of Marshal Argolo Stinger Son, the Brazilian Imperial Army began the attack, while the 1st Battalion followed in the rear of the Brigade of Colonel Fernando Machado to ensure their safety. The Colonel ordered further that cavalry brigades and fire-hydrants to follow the bridge to face.

On the Paraguayan side, Colonel Serrano strengthened the defense of the land occupied, knowing that the fight on the bridge would be difficult, swelling the number of soldiers on the bridge with only the troops that were closer. The struggle depend more on dexterity of his men than the number of fighters on the river. In addition, a word-of-fire had been placed strategically next to the bridge to eliminate any soldier who exceed the other side.

The first encounter was with Lieutenant Colonel João Antônio de Oliveira Valporto, 16 which progressed with five companies of the 1st Battalion line toward the mouth fire-posted by the Paraguayans. His onslaught was positive because could take her, however, was faced with a great line of enemy infantry and also four more mouths-of-smoke, which struck with devastating power. Accordingly, the Companies Lieutenant Colonel retreated in a confused way to the other side.

Noticing that the battalion retreated, Colonel Fernando Machado advanced on the bridge with the bodies 34 and 48 of the Volunteers of the Homeland, thrusting against the enemy, leaving the 13th Corps line of protection for your artillery. However, his attack was a failure, because the enemy artillery opened heavy fire on his group, hitting him so deadly in the middle of the bridge.

John Niederauer Nephew crossed the bridge with 6 ° Group Lancers and flanking Battalions Brazilian Imperial Army, stormed the Paraguayan troops, which retreated hastily. With this, Niederauer was able to take the four fire-mouths of the enemy, which had managed to disband the ranks of the allied battalions.

The Brazilian Imperial army was weakening, losing many men and leaving many others out of the fight due to injury or bruising. The delay in the appearance of General Osório to combat, as determined previously by Marshal Duke of Caxias, made the latter, at 65 years of age, marched toward the enemy, cheering and calling the emperor Brazilians for what seemed to be the "all or nothing" this first episode of the War of the Triple Alliance. Soldiers weakened, but touched by the bravery of his marshal, followed him for a showdown with redoubled spirit and took the position permanently.

See also
 Ytororó order of battle

References

Sources
 http://www.geocities.com/Pentagon/Camp/2523

Ytororó
Ytororó
Ytororó
Ytororó
December 1868 events
1868 in Paraguay
History of Central Department